The Brazilian Championship was the national ice hockey championship in Brazil. It was first contested in 2008 and was held annually through 2010. The competition has not been arranged since then.

History
In 2008, the Hockey Association of the State of São Paulo, where most ice hockey activities in Brazil take place, decided to organize a national championship. Sociedade Hípica de Campinas won every edition of the championship.

Champions

2008: Sociedade Hípica de Campinas
2009: Sociedade Hípica de Campinas
2010: Sociedade Hípica de Campinas

References

External links
 FPHG official website
 List of Brazilian champions on hockeyarenas.net

Ice hockey leagues